The .35 Winchester Self-Loading (also called .35SL, .35SLR, or .35WSL) is an American rifle cartridge.

Overview
Winchester introduced the .32SL and .35SL in the Winchester '05 self-loading rifle as a centerfire cartridge version of the Winchester '03. The .35SL proved popular at first with the general public as a short-range deer and black bear hunting cartridge, but was soon superseded by the introduction of the more powerful .351SL in the Winchester '07.

Many now consider the .35SL inadequate as a deer round, but it may still be suitable for coyote or similar medium-sized game at close ranges. When first introduced however, the notable firearm expert Townsend Whelen noted the .35SL cartridge as displaying similar ballistics as the .38-40 black powder, low-pressure cartridge.

Dimensions

See also
List of cartridges by caliber
Table of handgun and rifle cartridges
9mm caliber

References

External links

 Winchester's .35 WSL Cartridges, not .351 WSL 
 .35 Winchester Self-Loading (.35 WSL)
 .35 Winchester Self-Loading / .35 WSL

Pistol and rifle cartridges
Winchester Repeating Arms Company cartridges